Parlington is a civil parish in the metropolitan borough of the City of Leeds, West Yorkshire, England.  The parish contains 18 listed buildings that are recorded in the National Heritage List for England.  Of these, two are listed at Grade II*, the middle of the three grades, and the others are at Grade II, the lowest grade.  The parish was centred on the country house of Parlington Hall, but this was largely demolished in 1952.  Most of the listed buildings are in the remaining estate, and include a triumphal arch, a bridge, a tunnel, the home farm, a garden house and associated garden walls, an icehouse, a group of stallion pens, a deer shelter, and lodges at the entrances to the grounds. The other listed buildings are a group of almshouses and associated structures, a farmhouse, and a milepost.


Key

Buildings

References

Citations

Sources

 

Lists of listed buildings in West Yorkshire